DH4 may refer to:

 Airco DH.4, British World War I two-seat biplane
 de Lackner HZ-1 Aerocycle, also known as the YHO-2 and DH-4 Heli-Vector (1950s)
 Bombardier Dash 8 Q400, turboprop passenger airliner (since 1996, called DH4 by various airlines)